The Emperor's Sweetheart (German: Kaiserliebchen) is a 1931 German historical musical comedy film directed by Hans Tintner and starring Liane Haid, Walter Janssen and Wilhelm Bendow. It was shot at the Grunewald Studios in Berlin. The film's sets were designed by the art director Max Heilbronner. An operetta film, it is based on the stage operetta of the same title composed by Emil Berté. It was distributed by the German branch of the American company Fox Film.

Cast
 Liane Haid as 	Liesl, des Postmeisters Tochter
 Walter Janssen as 	Kaiser Josef
 Wilhelm Bendow as 	Rosenberg, Adjutant Kaiser Josefs
 Collette Jell as Jeanette, Prima-Ballerina
 Hans Jaray as 	Veilchen
 August Junker as 	Valentin, Hausmeister
 Attila Hörbiger as Josef Grundner, Postillon
 Olly Gebauer as 	Hilde, Liesels Freundin
 Liselotte Schaak as 	Zofe	
 Henry Bender as 	Hofrat Sittenius
 Heinrich Heilinger as 	Bartel, Schmied
 Valy Arnheim as Fürst Clary
 Karl Elzer as Direktor des Burgtheaters
 Karl Harbacher as 	Sein Assistent
 Klaus Pohl as 	Friseur
 Georg H. Schnell as Hauptmann Erlaa 
 Marian Alma as Bürgermeister von Wien
 Gertrud de Lalsky as	Kaiserin Maria Theresia
 Ferdinand Martini as 	Liesls Vater

References

Bibliography 
 Giesen, Rolf. The Nosferatu Story: The Seminal Horror Film, Its Predecessors and Its Enduring Legacy. McFarland, 2019.
 Klaus, Ulrich J. Deutsche Tonfilme: Jahrgang 1931. Klaus-Archiv, 2006.

External links 
 

1931 films
Films of the Weimar Republic
German comedy films
1931 comedy films
German musical films
1931 musical films
1930s German-language films
Films directed by Hans Tintner
Fox Film films
German black-and-white films
Films based on operettas
Operetta films
1930s German films
Films set in Vienna
Films set in the 18th century
German historical films
1930s historical films